The Doctor's Office was a historic professional office building in Plantersville, Dallas County, Alabama.  The one-story, wood-frame structure was built in a vernacular interpretation of Greek Revival architecture c. 1850.  The narrow main facade was three bays wide, with a pedimented one-story porch spanning the entire width.  An entrance was situated in the middle bay, with a window to either side.  The interior contained a single room.  It was added to the National Register of Historic Places on January 29, 1987, as a part of the Plantersville Multiple Resource Area.

References

National Register of Historic Places in Dallas County, Alabama
Commercial buildings completed in 1850
Greek Revival architecture in Alabama
Commercial buildings on the National Register of Historic Places in Alabama